Bellmead is a city in McLennan County, Texas, United States. The population was 10,494 at the 2020 census. It is part of the Waco Metropolitan Statistical Area. The word Bellmead means "Beautiful Autumn Valley" and was the name given to the region by its native inhabitants.

Geography

Bellmead is located at  (31.596765, –97.096627).

Demographics

As of the 2020 United States census, there were 10,494 people, 3,967 households, and 2,417 families residing in the city.

As of the census of 2010, there were 9,901 people, 3,513 households, and a labor force size of 4,756 people. The population density was 571.0 people per square kilometre (1,549/sq mi). The racial makeup of the city was 42.5% White, 17.2% African American, 0.4% Native American, 0.6% Asian, 0.1% from other races, and 1.5% from two or more races. Hispanic or Latino of any race is 37.8% of the population.

There were 3,513 households, out of which 47.01% had children under the age of 18 living with them. Within the population, 30.5% are under 18 years of age. The average household size was 2.5. Women comprise 48.9% of the population while men make up 51.1%.

The average income for a household in the city was $43,523, and the median income for a family was $34,511. The per capita income for the city was $16,910. Within the population 65.7% have graduated from high school and nearly 11% of these people have completed a higher degree.

References

Cities in McLennan County, Texas
Cities in Texas